The 1967–68 Rheinlandliga was the 16th season of the highest amateur class of the Rhineland Football Association under the name of 1. Amateurliga Rheinland. It was a predecessor of today's Rheinlandliga.

Results
Rhineland champion was SC Sinzig, who participated as a Rhineland representative at the German football amateur championship 1968 and failed there, in the round of 16, to the Württemberg representative SSV Reutlingen 05.

The relegation to the second amateur league was made by SV Ehrang, FV Rübenach, and FC Horchheim.

For the following 1968–69 season, FC Bitburg, FV Engers, VfL Trier and SG Altenkirchen moved up from the 2. The amateur league, as well as descendant SSV Mülheim from the II. Division.

References

1968 in association football
Football in Rhineland-Palatinate
1967 in association football